USS Hope may refer to the following ships of the United States Navy:

 , was a Civil War gunboat purchased by the US Navy in November 1861 and sold 25 October 1865
 , was a hospital ship commissioned 15 August 1944

See also
 

United States Navy ship names